One True Love may refer to:

 One True Love (2000 film), American film
 One True Love (2008 film), Philippine film
 One True Love (TV series),  Philippine television series
 One True Love (song), by The O'Kanes